History's Future is a 2016 Dutch drama film directed by Fiona Tan. It was listed as one of eleven films that could be selected as the Dutch submission for the Best Foreign Language Film at the 89th Academy Awards, but it was not nominated.

Cast
 Mark O'Halloran as MP
 Denis Lavant as Lottery Ticket Seller
 Anne Consigny as Caroline
 Hristos Passalis as Yorgos
 Manjinder Virk as Phoebe
 Rifka Lodeizen as Anna
 Brian Gleeson as Driver
 Johanna ter Steege as Therapist

References

External links
 

2016 films
2016 drama films
Dutch drama films
2010s Dutch-language films
2016 directorial debut films